Onstwedde is a village in the region of Westerwolde and part of Groningen in the Netherlands. It is located in the municipality of Stadskanaal.

Onstwedde was also the former name of the municipality of Stadskanaal, until 1969.

History 
Onstwedde was first mentioned in 875 as Uneswido in documents of the Werden Abbey. The name means the forest (-wido similar to the English wood) of Une (first name). The village is a double esdorp, a communal pasture surrounded by houses. The northern pasture was called Wold, and the southern pasture Loug. Onstwedde was a part of Westerwolde, a region dominated by raised bogs which formed the natural border between Groningen, East Frisia and the Prince-Bishopric of Münster. Onstwedde is located in the valley of the  river, and was a fertile island surrounded by bogs on all sides.

A dominant feature of Onstwedde is the Nicolaas Church which was constructed around 1500. It is assumed that the church was also used as a fortification. 

Onstwedde used to be the main village of the region. In 1765, the city of Groningen started to dig the Stadskanaal to the south of Onstwedde in order to exploit the peat. In 1840, the population of Onstwedde was 2,405 people, and Stadskanaal had 1,980 inhabitants. Stadskanaal soon surpassed Onstwedde, and in 1882, the town hall was moved to Stadskanaal. In 1969, the municipality was renamed Stadskanaal.

On 20 April 1943, the Royal Canadian Air Force bomber Mosquito II crashed and burnt in Smeerling near Onstwedde. The crew members are buried in a Commonwealth War Grave on the municipal cemetery.

Education 
The two elementary schools of Onstwedde merged into a single entity. Since 2011, the kindergarten, elementary school and high school moved into MFA De Bast, a single building. Onstwedde is one of the few places in the Netherlands where all educational facilities are concentrated in a single building.

Smeerling 

The hamlet of Smeerling is located on the road to Vlagtwedde. It contains about ten houses and is home to approximately 25 people, and is considered a part of Onstwedde for statistical and postal services. 

There are eight farms in the hamlet which are in similar condition to the 1830 situation. Five of the farms are monuments, the others are from a later date, but traditionally constructed and match the surroundings. In 1972, the entire hamlet was designated a protected monument. The protected area measures . A two kilometre path has been constructed through the hamlet, forests and meadows of Smeerling.

Notable people 
 Henk Bleker (born 1953), Dutch politician
 Izaak Reijnders (1879–1966), Dutch general

Gallery

References

External links

 www.onstwedde.info (in Dutch)

Populated places in Groningen (province)
Former municipalities of Groningen (province)
Stadskanaal
875 establishments